Vladimir Solovyov may refer to:

 Vladimir Solovyov (philosopher) (1853–1900), Russian philosopher
 Vladimir Solovyov (cosmonaut) (born 1946), Soviet-Russian cosmonaut
 Vladimir Solovyov (rower) (born 1946), Soviet-Russian Olympic rower
 Vladimir Solovyov (TV presenter) (born 1963), Russian television presenter, writer and propagandist
 Vladimir Solovyov (automobile engineer), Soviet automotive designer, first Chief Designer at VAZ
 Vladimir Solovyov, a Fabergé workmaster